The 2016–17 Mohun Bagan A.C. season is the 127th season of Mohun Bagan A.C. since the club's formation in 1889 and their 10th season in the I-League which is India's top football league. They finished third in the table in the Calcutta Football League. They finished second in the I-League and third in group stage of the AFC Cup. Mohun Bagan ended the season as runners-up of Federation Cup.

Transfers

In

Pre-season

Mid-season

Out

Pre-season

Mid-season

Kits
Supplier: Shiv Naresh / Sponsors: Legion

Pre-season

Overview
June

On 14 June 2016 Mohun Bagan announced that they would be fielding a junior side in the Calcutta Football League which would be mentored by assistant coach Sankarlal Chakraborty. The club officials also announced that they would not be fielding a side in the exhibition matches of the Calcutta Football League against East Bengal and Mohammedan due to disagreement with the IFA over television broadcast rights sharing and match-day ticket distribution.

Mohun Bagan confirmed the signing of former Salgaocar striker Darryl Duffy on 30 June 2016, striking a 1-year deal with the Scottish forward.

July

Mohun Bagan started their training for the season on 6 July 2016 under the guidance of assistant coach Sankarlal Chakraborty.

On 18 July 2016, Bagan's new striker, Darryl Duffy arrived in Kolkata and joined practice the following day. Mohun Bagan played their first practice match of the season against Peerless on 19 July 2016, where they went down 2–0 against their opponents.

On 22 July 2016, the Mariners played their second practice match of the season against a weak CFC and demolished their opponents 8–0. Star striker Darryl Duffy scored a brace and also found the back of the net for the first time in Green and Maroon colours, while other scorers included the lights of Kean Lewis, Tapan Maity (brace), Pankaj Moula, Babul Biswas, Ajay Singh.

Mohun Bagan played their 3rd practice match of the season on 27 July 2016, against Kalyani XI, at their home ground. The Mariners won 2–0 courtesy goals from Darryl Duffy and new recruit Simranjit Singh.

August

Mohun Bagan played their 4th and final practice match of the season on 2 August 2016, against premier division side Railway F.C. Darryl Duffy and Raju Gaikwad scored to give the Mariners a comfortable 2–0 victory.

On 4 August 2016, Mohun Bagan announced the signing of their second foreign recruit, English defender Danny Seaborne.

Matches

Competitions

Calcutta Football League

Overview
August

Mohun Bagan played their first match of the season in the Calcutta Football League tie against Aryan. The Mariners got off to a brilliant start in the season as they demolished their opponents 5–1, courtesy a hat-trick from Darryl Duffy and goals each from Prabir Das and Azharuddin Mallick.

On 9 August 2016, Mohun Bagan announced the signing of midfielder Thangjam Singh from ISL team Mumbai City FC.

Mohun Bagan continued their winning run in the Calcutta football league, when they demolished George Telegraph 4–0 in their 2nd game of the season. Prabir Das was the star performer of the match scoring 2 goals while Darryl Duffy and Thangjam Singh scored the other two goals.

On 14 August 2016, the Mariners won their third consecutive match of the season propelling them to the top of the Calcutta football league standings. Bagan defeated Southern Samity courtesy the solo goal of new recruit Ajay Singh. On 16 August 2016, Mohun Bagan announced the signing of Haroon Fakruddin in place of English defender Danny Seaborne who left the club on basis of a mutual understanding.

On 17 August 2016, Mohun Bagan announced the signing of their third foreigner for the Calcutta football league as they finalised a deal with Nigerian striker Daniel Bedemi.

Mohun Bagan won their 4th consecutive match of the season on 18 August 2016, when they defeated Bhawanipore 1–0, courtesy a brilliant goal from Thangjam Singh.

The Mariners dropped their first points of the season, when they were held to a goalless draw by Peerless on 22 August 2016 in their 5th match of the season. This draw put them in 2nd position, 2 points behind arch rivals East Bengal.

Mohun Bagan were level 1–2 against Tollygunge Agragami before the match got abandoned in the 93rd minute due to crowd trouble. Mohun Bagan were denied 3 apparently legitimate goals by the assistant referee due to offside. The decisive finish by Azharuddin Mallick in the 93rd minute was ruled out due to offside by the assistant referee. This goal could have given Mohun Bagan a 2–1 lead and a possible 3 points from the match. This decision by the referee sparked controversy and a packed gallery at the Mohun Bagan ground erupted into protest. Despite much effort by the club officials and police force thereof, the match could not be restarted and was declared abandoned.

On 31 August 2016, the Indian Football Association announced a replay of the abandoned Mohun Bagan and Tollygunge Agragami match, but kept the decisions on the date, time and venue of the match as pending.

September

On 2 September 2016, Mohun Bagan finally returned to winning ways, when they defeated United 3–1 courtesy a brace from Daniel Bedemi and a solitary goal from Darryl Duffy.

On 7 Sepeteber 2016, Mohun Bagan refused to take the field in the scheduled Kolkata Derby and gave arch-rivals East Bengal a walkover, citing lack of opportunities of pre-match practice at the Kalyani Stadium. Mohun Bagan had requested the IFA to postpone the match by at least one day. The association however did not heed to this request and hence Bagan did not field a team in the match.

On 10 September 2016, Mohun Bagan came up with a brilliant performance against a depleted Army XI side, where they defeated the army men by 6–0. Daniel Bedemi stood out, scoring 4 of the goals by himself, while Darryl Duffy and Azharuddin Mallick added to Bagan's tally.

Mohun Bagan lost their first match of the season against Tollygunge Agragami on 15 September 2016. The Mariners failed to equalize after a 32nd minute Joel Sunday strike, as they went down 0–2 to the minnows.

On 18 September 2016, Mohun Bagan lost their final match of the league by 1–5 against city rivals Mohammedan. This loss meant that the Green and Maroon Brigade slipped to 3rd position in the league, while Mohammedan finished runners-up after eight long years.

Om 20 September 2016, along expected lines, the IFA announced East Bengal the winners of the abandoned derby with a score of 3–0 in their favour. The association also announced further actions against Mohun Bagan stating that it would decide after the conclusion of the league, whether to deduct another 2 points from Mohun Bagan's tally for not informing of not playing the derby. The parent body also issued show-causes to two Mohun Bagan officials for derogatory remarks against the association.

Matches

Table

I-League

Season overview
January

Mohun Bagan started off their I-League campaign on 8 January 2017 with a hard fought 1–0 win against a weak Churchill Brothers side. Balwant Singh was the lone scorer for the Mariners. Mohun Bagan continued their winning run into the 2nd match of the league, when they defeated Shillong Lajong 2–0 at home, owing to a brace from Scottish striker Darryl Duffy. The Mariners bulldozed league newcomers Minerva Punjab by a 4–0 margin, as star player, Sony Norde made his first appearance of the season. Darryl Duffy and Jeje Lalpekhlua netted in a brace each in Bagan's thumping victory over the Punjab-based side. Mohun Bagan continued their winning run in the season for the 4th consecutive match when they edged past newcomers Chennai City 2–1 in an away encounter with goals from Jeje Lalpekhlua and Sony Norde. Mohun Bagan played out their first draw against DSK Shivajians in the 5th round of the league, with the scoreline remaining at 0–0 post 90 minutes, owing to a lackluster performance from the Green and Maroon strike force.

Mohun Bagan returned to winning ways as they got their AFC Cup campaign running with a 2–1 away victory over Sri Lankan side Colombo, with Kean Lewis and Sehnaj Singh finding the back of the net for the Mariners.

February

The Mariners returned to winning ways in the I-League as they managed a hard fought 3–2 win against Aizawl at home. Darryl Duffy scored the fastest goal of the league, putting the Mariners in the lead just 70 minutes into the match. He later scored the 3rd for the team and his second of the night as he converted from the spot. Jeje Lalpekhlua scored the second goal for the Mariners aiding the victory.

Mohun Bagan continued their winning run in the AFC Cup as they defeated Colombo 2–1 in the home leg encounter at the Rabindra Sarobar Stadium. Sony Norde scored his first goal of the competition and then went onto assist Darryl Duffy for the latter's first goal of the tournament. In the late stages of the match, Colombo pulled one back, but it was too little too late, and Mohun Bagan progressed to the next round 4–2 on aggregate.

Mohun Bagan were up against arch rivals East Bengal in the 8th round of the league on 12 February. In a match marred by ultra-defensive play on both sides the Mariners shared points with their bitter rivals as the scoreline read 0–0. In the next match, the Mariners were held to a goalless draw at the Cooperage Football Stadium in an away encounter against Mumbai. Mohun Bagan finally returned to winning ways in their next match at home against DSK Shivajians when they defeated the latter 3–1 courtesy a brace from Balwant Singh, while Katsumi Yusa netted his first of the season from the spot.

The Mariners returned to the AFC Cup campaign with a 1–1 draw in an away encounter against Club Valencia. Darryl Duffy put the Green and Maroon brigade ahead in the 6th minute, while Club Valencia restored parity through a spot-kick in the 71st minute. In the return leg encounter Mohun Bagan thrashed Club Valencia 4–1, to go through to the group stage on a 5–2 aggregate. Jeje Lalpekhlua found his scoring boots as he netted in a brace, while Sony Norde scored one of the other goals.

March

The Mariners fell to their first defeat of the season when they lost 2–1 to Churchill Brothers in an away encounter. Prabir Das gave the Green and Maroon brigade the lead, only to be nullified twice in the second half. Mohun Bagan failed to return to winning ways in their home encounter against Mumbai where they played out a 2–2 draw courtesy goals from Pritam Kotal and Balwant Singh. The Mariners were up against Bengaluru FC in an I-League away encounter next, where they played out a respectable goalless draw after being brought down to 10 men, courtesy a double yellow card to Subhasish Bose.

They were up against the same opponents in the group stage encounter of the AFC Cup 3 days later at the same venue. This time around, Mohun Bagan went down 2–1 to their opponents even after taking a 1st half lead, courtesy a spot kick strike from skipper Katsumi Yusa.

April

The Green and Maroon brigade came out recharged after the international break, as they drubbed Bengaluru FC 3–0 at home, to come back strongly in the title race. The skipper Katsumi Yusa scored a brace, while the other goal was scored by Darryl Duffy.

Mohun Bagan took their winning ways into the AFC Cup group stage where they sailed past Bangladeshi club Dhaka Abahani 3–1 to register their first win in the group stage. Jeje Lalpekhlua, Balwant Singh and Sony Norde found the back of the net to give the Mariners a crucial 3 points.

On 9 April 2017, Mohun Bagan were once again up against arch-rivals East Bengal in the I-League. It was the Haitian, Sony Norde who opened the scoring for Bagan in the 36th minute, while 7 minutes later youngstar Azharuddin Mallick came up with a pitch of a strike to make it 2–0 for the Mariners. In the 2nd half, East Bengal made the job even more difficult for themselves as Willis Plaza was given the marching orders by the referee for an off the ball push on Anas Edathodika. In the late stages of injury time East Bengal did manage to pull one goal back, through Rowllin Borges, but it proved too little too late.

Matches

Table

Results by round

AFC Cup

Preliminary round

Play-off round

Group stage

Table

Matches

Federation Cup

Group stage
Group B

Semifinal

Final

Squad

{| class="wikitable" style="text-align:center; font-size:90%; width:80%"
|-
!style="background:#7A1024; color:white; text-align:center;"|Squad No.
!style="background:#1A5026; color:white; text-align:center;"|Name
!style="background:#7A1024; color:white; text-align:center;"|Nationality
!style="background:#1A5026; color:white; text-align:center;"|Position
!style="background: #7A1024; color:white; text-align:center;"|Date of Birth (Age)
|-
!colspan=6 style="background:#7a1024; color:white; text-align:center;"|Goalkeepers
|-
|1
|Pawan Kumar
|
|GK
|
|-
|22
|Shilton Pal
|
|GK
|
|-
|24
|Debjit Majumder
|
|GK
|
|-
|42
|Shibinraj K
|
|GK
|
|-
!colspan=6 style="background:#1A5026; color:white; text-align:center;"|Defenders
|-
|2
|Sarthak Golui
|
|DF
|
|-
|3
|Raju Gaikwad
|
|DF
|
|-
|4
|Kingshuk Debnath
|
|DF
|
|-
|14
|Eduardo Ferreira
|
|DF
|
|-
|17
|Subhasish Bose
|
|DF
|
|-
|20
|Pritam Kotal
|
|DF
|
|-
|21
|Sanjay Balmuchu
|
|DF
|
|-
|25
|Bikramjeet Singh
|
|DF
|
|-
|26
|Shouvik Ghosh(loaned from North East United)
|
|DF
|
|-
|33
|Prabir Das
|
|DF
|
|-
|45
|Anas Edathodika
|
|DF
|
|-
!colspan=6 style="background:#7a1024; color:white; text-align:center;"|Midfielders
|-
|6
|Bikramjit Singh
|
|MF
|
|-
|8
|Kean Lewis
|
|MF
|
|-
|10
|Katsumi Yusa (captain)
|
|MF
|
|-
|11
|Pronay Halder
|
|MF
|
|-
|13
|Sourav Das
|
|MF
|
|-
|16
|Sony Norde
|
|MF
|
|-
|23
|Souvik Chakraborty
|
|MF
|
|-
|27
|Pintu Mahata
|
|MF
|—
|-
|28
|Sehnaj Singh
|
|MF
|
|-
|29
|Raynier Fernandes
|
|MF
|
|-
|30
|Pankaj Moula
|
|MF
|
|-
|32
|Robinson Singh
|
|MF
|
|-
!colspan=6 style="background:#1A5026; color:white; text-align:center;"|Forwards
|-
|9
|Darryl Duffy
|
|FW
|
|-
|12
|Jeje Lalpekhlua
|
|FW
|
|-
|15
|Balwant Singh
|
|FW
|
|-
|35
|Azharuddin Mallick
|
|FW
|
|-

Technical Staff
{| class="wikitable"
|-
! Position
! Name
|-
| Chief coach
| Sanjoy Sen
|-
| Assistant coach
| Sankarlal Chakraborty
|-
| Goalkeeping coach
| Arpan Dey
|-
| Physical Trainer
| Djair Miranda Garcia
|-
| Physiotherapist
| Abhinandan Chatterjee
|-
| Club Doctor
| Dr. Protim Ray
|-
| Team Manager
| Satyajit Chatterjee

Player statistics

Appearances and goals

Last Updated: 9 April 2017  Apps: (Matches Started)+(Substitute Appearances)

Top scorers

Source: soccerway
Updated: 31 May 2017

Disciplinary record
{| class="wikitable" style="text-align:center; font-size:95%"
!rowspan="2"|No.
!rowspan="2"|Pos.
!rowspan="2"|Nat.
!rowspan="2"|Player
!colspan="3"|CFL
!colspan="3"|I-League
!colspan="3"|AFC Cup
!colspan="3"|Total
!rowspan="2"|Notes
|-
!!!!!
!!!!!
!!!!!
!!!!!
|-
|17
|DF
|
|Subhasish Bose
|0||0||0
|1||2||0
|0||0||0
|1||2||0
|Missed Match: vs Shillong Lajong(13 January 2017)Missed Match: vs Bengaluru FC(1 April 2017)
|-
|33
|DF
|
|Prabir Das
|1||0||0
|3||0||0
|0||0||0
|4||0||0
|
|-
|11
|MF
|
|Pronay Halder
|0||0||0
|3||0||0
|0||0||0
|3||0||0
|
|-
|9
|FW
|
|Darryl Duffy
|0||0||0
|2||0||0
|0||0||0
|2||0||0
|
|-
|15
|FW
|
|Balwant Singh
|0||0||0
|2||0||0
|0||0||0
|2||0||0
|
|-
|10
|MF
|
|Katsumi Yusa
|0||0||0
|2||0||0
|0||0||0
|2||0||0
|
|-
|3
|DF
|
|Raju Gaikwad
|1||0||0
|1||0||0
|0||0||0
|2||0||0
|
|-
|19
|DF
|
|Tonmoy Ghosh
|2||0||0
|0||0||0
|0||0||0
|2||0||0
|Missed Match: vs Tollygunge Agragami(15 September 2016)
|-
|35
|FW
|
|Azharuddin Mallick
|0||0||0
|1||0||0
|0||0||0
|1||0||0
|
|-
|16
|MF
|
|Sony Norde
|0||0||0
|0||0||0
|1||0||0
|1||0||0
|
|-
|28
|MF
|
|Sehnaj Singh
|0||0||0
|1||0||0
|0||0||0
|1||0||0
|
|-
|14
|DF
|
|Eduardo Ferreira
|0||0||0
|1||0||0
|0||0||0
|1||0||0
|
|-
|20
|DF
|
|Pritam Kotal
|0||0||0
|1||0||0
|0||0||0
|1||0||0
|
|-
|21
|DF
|
|Sanjay Balmuchu
|1||0||0
|0||0||0
|0||0||0
|1||0||0
|
|-
|25
|DF
|
|Bikramjeet Singh
|0||0||0
|0||0||0
|1||0||0
|1||0||0
|
|-
|45
|DF
|
|Anas Edathodika
|0||0||0
|0||0||0
|1||0||0
|1||0||0
|
|-
|27
|MF
|
|Tapan Maity
|1||0||0
|0||0||0
|0||0||0
|1||0||0
|
|-
|23
|DF
|
|Haroon Fakruddin
|1||0||0
|0||0||0
|0||0||0
|1||0||0
|
|-

References

Mohun Bagan AC seasons
Mohun Bagan